Atomic Rooster are an English progressive rock band from London. Formed in 1969, the group originally included former Crazy World of Arthur Brown keyboardist Vincent Crane and drummer Carl Palmer, in addition to bassist, flautist and vocalist Nick Graham. Shortly after the release of the band's debut album Atomic Roooster, guitarist John Du Cann joined the group and took over on lead vocals, as Graham departed. Palmer left later in the year to form Emerson, Lake & Palmer, with Ric Parnell temporarily taking his place. Paul Hammond later joined in time for the recording of Death Walks Behind You. During the recording of 1971's In Hearing of Atomic Rooster, Pete French was brought in as the band's new lead vocalist. Du Cann was subsequently fired by Crane, with Hammond choosing to leave alongside him.

Du Cann and Hammond were replaced by Steve Bolton and Parnell, respectively. Chris Farlowe took over from French in early 1972, first contributing to the album Made in England. Bolton had left the group by the end of the year, with Johnny Mandala taking his place for the 1973 release Nice 'n' Greasy. By early 1974, everyone but Crane had left Atomic Rooster; the keyboardist continued to tour under the name "Vincent Crane's Atomic Rooster", adding former Sam Apple Pie members Sam "Tomcat" Sampson (vocals), Andy Johnson, Denny "Pancho" Barnes (both guitars), Bob "Dog" Rennie (bass) and Lee Baxter Hayes (drums) before disbanding the group in early 1975. Following the band's breakup, Crane worked on music for plays and radio dramas, as well as collaborating with former bandmate Arthur Brown.

In mid-1980, Crane reformed Atomic Rooster with former guitarist and vocalist Du Cann. Preston Heyman performed drums on the band's self-titled comeback album. Former Cream drummer Ginger Baker joined for a brief period in September, but had left within a month to join Hawkwind. Paul Hammond had returned to the band by the end of the year, marking a reunion of the Death Walks Behind You lineup. Du Cann left in 1982, with guitars on the band's seventh album Headline News performed by new member Bernie Tormé and Pink Floyd's David Gilmour. After a few months of touring, with more lineup changes, Atomic Rooster disbanded again in late 1983. Crane committed suicide in 1989, while Hammond died of an accidental drug overdose in 1992, and Du Cann died after a heart attack in 2011.

Over 30 years after the band's breakup, Atomic Rooster reformed in 2016 with the blessing of Crane's widow Jean, with former members Pete French and Steve Bolton joined by bassist Shug Millidge, keyboardist Christian Madden and drummer Bo Walsh. Madden was replaced by Adrian Gautrey in 2017, after the former joined Liam Gallagher's touring band.

Members

Current

Former

Timeline

Line-ups

References

Atomic Rooster